Guang'an Metro or Guang'an Rail Transit or Guang'an SkyRail is a light metro monorail system using BYD SkyRail monorail technology in Guang'an, Sichuan Province, China. The first line has been under construction since February 2017. The first line was planned to start test run in June 2020 and open in October 2020, however the testing schedule has been postponed. 

A second line is planned.

Lines under construction

Line 1 is north–south line. It will run between Guangmen and Youkezhongxin. 

The line is currently under construction. It was announced that a planning to start test run would start in June 2020, and scheduled to open in October 2020. However, with several changes to the policy of constructing rapid transit systems, the original schedules are upset.

A northern extension for 5 stations is under planning.

Planned

Network Map

References

Rapid transit in China
Rail transport in Sichuan
Transport infrastructure under construction in China
Monorails
Monorails in China